Baltimore Jewish Life is a local newspaper that gears itself towards the local jewish population in Baltimore, Maryland. The paper is distributed around the city at supermarkets and mailed to houses that subscribe all at no cost. They support the paper using money from advertisements. Baltimore Jewish Life describes themself as "an educational service that offers engaging news to the community." Although it self-describes as "aggregating the best of the Internet" it is also works with a "team of volunteers."

Their material has been cited by The Jewish Press and others:
 2018:
 2015:
 2013:
 2010:

Reporting
The Baltimore Department of Health used a Baltimore Jewish Life story on their web site
to report about planned legislation.

References

External links
 Baltimore Jewish Life's "About Us"
 Official Website's Index

American news websites